Andy Chrisman is a former member of the American contemporary Christian music group 4Him, a solo Christian music recording artist and a worship leader.

Background 

Chrisman originally met the other 4Him members when they sang together in Truth, a contemporary Christian vocal group founded in the late 1960s and directed by Roger Breland. Representatives from a record label heard the band a few times and signed them to become a Christian band. Their first single was "Where there is Faith".

Chrisman left 4Him sometime in the 2000s to pursue a solo career. He released his first solo recording, One, in 2004. He has also been a worship pastor at Church on the Move, in Tulsa, Oklahoma. In 2008, along with the Church on the Move Praise Band, he released Beautiful Name, a live worship CD. Chrisman was briefly the worship leader at Celebrate Church in Celebration, Florida until 2006.

References

Christian hymnwriters
Christian music songwriters
American performers of Christian music
Performers of contemporary worship music
1972 births
Living people